This is a list of C-pop artists and groups. C-pop, which encompasses mainly Mandopop and Cantopop (and to some extent Hokkien pop and pop music of other Chinese dialects), represents the main pop music in the People's Republic of China, Taiwan, Hong Kong, Macau, Malaysia and Singapore, as well as Chinese-speaking communities in the rest of the world.

Almost all popular actors and actresses in Chinese entertainment have released songs to boost their popularity, and thus technically are considered C-pop artists. The list below only includes those whose musical careers are significant, although that is hard to define objectively.

Popular Chinese rock and hip hop artists are also included.

Female artists 

A-fu
A-Lin
A-mei
A-Sun
AGA
Alan Dawa Dolma
Priscilla Chan
Angela Chang
Deserts Chang
Cheer Chen
Kelly Chen
Sammi Cheng
Maggie Chiang
Vivian Chow
Tanya Chua
Genie Chuo
Gillian Chung
Leah Dou
Christine Fan
Mavis Fan
Mavis Hee
Denise Ho
Elva Hsiao
Jeannie Hsieh
Winnie Hsin
Evonne Hsu
Lala Hsu
Valen Hsu
Vivian Hsu
Ivy
Amber Kuo
Claire Kuo
Sandy Lam
Coco Lee
Fish Leong
Gigi Leung
Li Yuchun
Linda Liao
Duan Linxi
Rene Liu
Liu Shishi
Liu Yuxin
Candy Lo
Lu Keran
Karen Mok
Anita Mui
Na Ying
Kary Ng
One-Fang
Cass Phang
Wanting Qu
Sa Dingding
Fiona Sit
Tarcy Su
Stefanie Sun
Sunnee
Penny Tai
G.E.M. Tang
Stephy Tang
Teresa Teng
Hebe Tien
Tsai Chin
Jolin Tsai
Kay Tse
Janice Vidal
Cyndi Wang
Joanna Wang
Landy Wen
Meng Jia
Faye Wong
Ivana Wong
Xidan Girl
Faith Yang
Rainie Yang
Bella Yao
Sally Yeh
Miriam Yeung
Joey Yung
Jane Zhang
Jana Chen
Zhao Wei
Fong Fei Fei
Yangwei Linghua
Jenny Tseng
Bibi Zhou
Zhang Zining
Curley G
Wang Yijin
Liu Xiening
Chen Zhuoxuan
Nene
Cheng Xiao
Wu Xuanyi
Meng Meiqi
Zhao Yue
Ju Jingyi
Yu Yan
Xie Keyin
Xu Ziyin
Zhou Jieqiong

Male artists 

Huang Zitao
Bi Wenjun
Cai Xukun
Chang Chen-yue
Daniel Chan
Danny Chan
Eason Chan
Jackie Chan
Jordan Chan
Jeff Chang
Yu Jingtian
Phil Chang
Chang Yu-Sheng
Gary Chaw
Pakho Chau
Wakin Chau
Bobby Chen
Chen Chusheng
Edison Chen
Chen Linong
Ronald Cheng
Dicky Cheung
Hins Cheung
Hua Chenyu
Jacky Cheung
Leslie Cheung
Chyi Chin
Chou Chuan-huing
Eric Chou
Jay Chou
Cui Jian
Fan Chengcheng
Van Fan
Khalil Fong
Han Geng
Jam Hsiao
Hsiao Huang-chi
Anson Hu
Hu Xia
Stanley Huang
Yida Huang
Andy Hui
Samuel Hui
Richie Jen
Justin
Aaron Kwok
Leo Ku
Kun
Chet Lam
Leon Lai
Andy Lau
Hacken Lee
Nicky Lee
Edmond Leung
Li Wenhan
JJ Lin
Yoga Lin
Lin Yanjun
Liu Huan
Show Lo
Lo Ta-yu
Crowd Lu
Luhan
MC HotDog
Anthony Neely
Will Pan
Pu Shu
Sun Nan
William So
Alan Tam
David Tao
Nicholas Tse
Wang Feng
Jackson Wang
Jiro Wang
Karry Wang
Leehom Wang
Roy Wang
Wang Yibo
Vision Wei
Winwin
Anthony Wong
Dave Wong
Lucas
Michael Wong
Wu Bai
Kenji Wu
Kris Wu
Xie Hexian
Xu Song
Xu Wei
Aaron Yan
Yang Pei-An
Jackson Yi
Zeng Yi
Evan Yo
You Zhangjing
Harlem Yu
Joker Xue
Xiao Zhan
Jason Zhang
Lay Zhang
Zhou Yixuan
Zhou Zhennan
Zhu Zhengting
Zuoxiao Zuzhou
Liu Yu
Santa Uno
Rikimaru Chikada
Mika Hashizume
Nine
Lin Mo
Bo Yuan
Zhang Jiayuan
Zhou Keyu
Patrick Yin Haoyu
Liu Zhang

Music groups and bands 

183 Club
2moro
4 in Love
5566
A-One
at17
BEJ48
Beyond
BoBo
BonBon Girls
Boy Story
Boy'z
BY2
C AllStar
Catchers
Choc7
Comic Boyz
Da Mouth
Dream Girls
Energy
EO2
F.I.R.
F4
Fahrenheit
Fanxy Red
Four Golden Princess
INTO1
Grasshopper
GNZ48
I Me
JPM
K One
Lollipop F
M-Girls
Mayday
M.I.C.
My little airport
Nan Quan Mama
NEXT
Nine Percent
Phoenix Legend
Popu Lady
Power Station
Produce Pandas
R1SE
Rocket Girls
RubberBand
S.H.E
Shin
Super Impassioned Net Generation
SNH48
Sodagreen
SpeXial
Sweety
Tension
TFBOYS
The Flowers
THE9
Top Combine
Twins
UNINE
UNIQ
WayV
Xiao Hu Dui
X Nine
Y2J
Yu Quan
ZERO-G

See also

List of Chinese musicians
List of bands from Taiwan
Metal bands of Taiwan
List of Taiwanese people
List of Hong Kong people

List of Singaporeans
List of J-pop artists
List of K-pop artists
Music of China
Music of Taiwan
Music of Hong Kong
Music of Macau
Music of Singapore

 
C-pop
C-pop musicians